Aquila was the name of at least three ships of the Italian Navy and may refer to:
 , an  ordered by Romania as Vifor. Seized in 1915 by Italy and renamed before her launch in 1916. Transferred to Spain in 1939 as Melilla.
 , previously the passenger liner SS Roma. Conversion started in 1941 but was never finished. She was broken up in 1951.
 , an  launched in 1954 as the Dutch HNLMS Lynx. Transferred to Italy and renamed in 1961. She was stricken in 1991.

Italian Navy ship names